Hardwicke's bloodsucker (Calotes minor) is an agamid lizard and found in South Asia.

Morphology
Physical structure: This is a small stocky and pot-belly lizard with a short tail. Its head large and elongated, flat above, sloping towards snout. Its dorsal scales larger, strongly imbricate and keeled, pointing backward and upward, ventral scales smaller than dorsal; upper head scales larger, unequal, strongly keeled or tubercular. Females are larger than the males.

Color pattern: Dorsal color is olive-brown with three rows of dark-brown light edged spots on the back and base of the tail; spots of middle row are most prominent and rhomboidal; a white streak on each side of the neck is bifurcating behind and an oblique one from the eye to the angle of mouth; limbs are with dark-brown cross bars; throat is profusely spotted with dark-brown and orange; belly is yellowish-white with numerous orange dots. Color inside the mouth is ink-blue. Females are more brilliantly colored during breeding season.

Length: Maximum:18 cm, Common:10 cm. (Snout to vent 6 cm.)

Distribution
Found in Bangladesh (southeast part of the country), India (Madhya Pradesh, Uttar Pradesh, Rajasthan, Gujarat, Odissa) and Pakistan (Sindh).

Vernacular names
Bengali: আগামা গিরিগিটি, পাতি রক্তচোষা, পাতিয়াল গিরিগিটি (Patial girigiti), হার্ডউইকের গিরিগিটি।

English: Hardwicke's bloodsucker, Hardwicke's short-tail agama, dwarf rock agama, and lesser agama.

Hindi & other Indian languages: ?

Urdu & Sindhi: ?

Habitat
This lizard is terrestrial and sometimes arboreal; inhabits frequently fragmented dry forest, arid environments, barren desert and desolate areas across the Indo-Gangetic plains.

Habit
This lizard is diurnal and crepuscular. It shelters in burrows close to the roots of thorny bushes.  Generally it is found sitting on stones, but it can climb up shrubby vegetation. It is sluggish in movements, often not attempting to escape when approached. It is a docile species.

Diet
This lizard is mainly insectivorous; feeding on grasshoppers and their nymphs, earwigs, beetles, bugs, arthropods and spiders. Sometimes it also eats flowers.

Reproduction
This lizard is oviparous; the breeding season extends from April to June; it lays four to six hard shelled white eggs in burrows under the roots of vegetation.

Importance and uses
There are no known practical uses of this species, but it plays a role in the eco-system by eating various types of insects and otherwise.

Threat to humans
This lizard is non-venomous and completely harmless to humans.

Etymology
The species-name minor, a Latin word, meaning 'less' or 'smaller', also referring to the smaller size of this agamid.

Extra notes
This lizard has a reputation for being particularly harmful, which is totally baseless and has contributed much to its depletion.

References

Sources
 Blyth, E., 1856, Proceedings of the Society. Report of the Curator. J. Asiat. Soc. Bengal  25:448-449
 Boulenger, G.A., 1885, Catalogue of the Lizards in the British Museum (Nat. Hist.) I. Geckonidae, Eublepharidae, Uroplatidae, Pygopodidae, Agamidae. London: 450 pp.
 Boulenger, George A., 1890,  The Fauna of British India, Including Ceylon and Burma. Reptilia and Batrachia. Taylor & Francis, London, xviii, 541 pp.
 Günther, A., 1864,  The Reptiles of British India.  London (Taylor & Francis), xxvii + 452 pp.
 Hardwicke, F.R. & Gray, J.E., 1827,  A synopsis of the species of saurian reptiles, collected in India by Major-General Hardwicke.  Zool. J. London 3: 214-229
 Manthey, U. & Schuster, N., 1999, Agamen, 2. Aufl. Natur und Tier Verlag (Münster), 120 pp.
 Smith, M.A., 1935, Reptiles and Amphibia, Vol. II. in: The fauna of British India, including Ceylon and Burma. Taylor and Francis, London, 440 pp.

External links
 

Calotes
Reptiles of Pakistan
Reptiles described in 1827
Taxa named by Thomas Hardwicke
Taxa named by John Edward Gray